Humme may refer to:

Hümme, a district of the town Hofgeismar in Hesse, Germany
Humme (Weser), a river of North Rhine-Westphalia, Germany